Espen Salberg (born 28 March 1952 in Oslo, Norway) is a Norwegian ballroom dancer.

See also
Dance in Norway
List of dancers

References

Norwegian male dancers
Ballroom dancers
1952 births
Living people
Entertainers from Oslo